Juan Garat (born May 16, 1973) is a former professional tennis player from Argentina.

He played collegiate tennis for Troy University in Troy, Alabama from 1989 to 1993. While a member of the Trojans tennis team, he helped lead them to the NCAA Championships during the 1993 season. The Trojans finished the season ranked No. 8 in the Rolex National Rankings. For Garat's successes during his senior season, he was named an ITA All-American.

Upon graduating from Troy in 1993, Garat became a full-time professional tennis player, enjoying most of his tennis success while playing doubles. During his career, he won one doubles title. He achieved a career-high doubles ranking of World No. 85 in 1994.

Career finals

Doubles (1 titles, 2 runner-ups)

External links
 
 

Argentine male tennis players
People from Corrientes
Living people
1973 births
Sportspeople from Corrientes Province